Tar Heel (or Tarheel) is a nickname applied to the state and inhabitants of North Carolina as well as the nickname of the University of North Carolina athletic teams, students, alumni, and fans.

Tar Heel may also refer to:

Athletics
North Carolina Tar Heels, athletic teams of the University of North Carolina at Chapel Hill
Tar Heel League, a defunct minor league baseball league

Localities
Tar Heel, North Carolina, a town in Bladen County
Tarheel, North Carolina, an unincorporated community in western Gates County

Other
Tarheel Forensic League
Operation Tar Heels
Tar Heel (horse), Standardbred racehorse winner of the Little Brown Jug
The Carolina Tar Heels, an American old time string band active in the 1920s